The discography of the English doom metal band Cathedral consists of ten studio albums, eight EPs, a number of singles, one live album and two collections. Led by ex-Napalm Death vocalist Lee Dorrian, the band was signed to Earache Records in 1991. They briefly switched to Spitfire Records in 2002 and released The VIIth Coming. Later, they switched to Nuclear Blast and released two more studio albums. Cathedral's final album, The Last Spire was released through Dorrian's own label, Rise Above.

Studio albums

EPs

Live albums

Demos

Singles

Compilation albums

Split albums

Video albums

Music videos

References

Discographies of British artists
Heavy metal group discographies